Qasr-e Qand County is in Sistan and Baluchestan province, Iran. The capital of the county is the city of Qasr-e Qand. At the 2006 census, the county's population (as Qasr-e Qand District of Nik Shahr County and Talang Rural District of Chabahar County) was 51,973 in 9,816 households. The following census in 2011 counted 55,888 people in 12,640 households. The county was established by separating those divisions in 2013 to form Qasr-e Qand County. At the 2016 census, the county's population was 61,076 in 15,524 households.

Administrative divisions

The population history and structural changes of Qasr-e Qand County's administrative divisions over three consecutive censuses are shown in the following table. The latest census shows three districts, six rural districts, and one city.

References

 

Counties of Sistan and Baluchestan Province